Media5-fone was a VoIP softphone developed by Media5, a VoIP company based in Sherbrooke. It used the Session Initiation Protocol and was interoperable with most IP PBX systems and ITSPs. 

In August 31, 2018, following an end-of-life announcement issued the same year, Media5 discontinued the support for Media5-fone and subsequently removed the application from various app stores.

History 
The first iOS version of Media5-fone was released in June 2009. It was built for iPhone and iPod devices running on iPhone OS 3, a non multi-tasking operating system. Most IP PBX systems and Internet telephony service provider were compatible with the softclient. After this initial release, multiple features upgrade were made; VPN support, configurable ring-tone, Bluetooth, SIP-URI, and compatibility improvements.
 
In January 2010, Media5-fone was released on the OVI Store for the Nokia Smartphones running the S60 3rd Symbian Operating System. This edition survived a short period of time because of the S60 deprecation.
 
In mid 2010, Apple released iOS 4 and its multi-tasking support. Media5-fone has since been able to run in the background while another app was in the foreground. This brought the iOS edition of the softclient on even ground with the Symbian OS that already supported multi-tasking.
 
In February 2011, SRTP, SDES and TLS were added as additional features. In September 2011, Media5-fone was released on the Android Market (today Google Play). Since 2012, minor improvements were made and a new edition (Media5-fone MPS) supporting remote Device Provisioning was released. The MPS has also been made available on the Amazon Appstore with the support of Kindle Fire devices. Media5 Corporation is currently developing the Media5-RCS app, a VoIP Softclient that supports Rich Communication Services.

See also
 Comparison of VoIP software

References

External links
Official Media5 website

Communication software
VoIP software
Business software